"Supernova" is a song by American singer-songwriter Liz Phair from her second album, Whip-Smart, released in 1994.

The song received heavy rotation on radio stations and its music video was frequently aired on MTV. The song went on to hit number 6 on the Modern Rock Tracks chart and number 78 on the Billboard Hot 100. In 1995, the song was nominated for Best Female Rock Vocal Performance in the 37th Annual Grammy Awards.

This song was used for the soundtrack of the film Love & Other Drugs.

Background

Phair said, "I wanted to just kind of write about the joy of being in love and having sex be a part of that. ... I'm so awestruck by the fact that my body, which has evolved over millions of years, has these responses and it's all wrapped up with the emotions that I'm feeling. I wanted to describe every level of that in a song."

Track listings and formats

 Australian and German maxi-single
 "Supernova" (Album Version) – 2:50
 "Supernova" (Clean Version) – 2:49
 "Combo Platter" (Girlie Sound) – 4:48

 German cassette
 "Supernova" (LP Version) – 2:47
 "X-Ray Man" (Remix) – 2:30

 US 7-inch vinyl and cassette
 "Supernova" (Album Version) – 2:49
 "Combo Platter" (Girlysound) – 4:48

 US maxi-single
 "Supernova" (Edit) – 2:50
 "Supernova" (Clean Version) – 2:49
 "Combo Platter" (Girlie Sound) – 4:48

Credits and personnel
 Liz Phair – vocals, guitar, writer, director
 Brad Wood – drums, percussion, recording, mixing
 Casey Rice – talking guitar lines, guitar solo, recording, mixing
 Leroy Bach – bass
 Roger Seibel – mastering

Credits and personnel adapted from Whip-Smart album liner notes.

Charts

References

1994 singles
1994 songs
Liz Phair songs
Matador Records singles
Songs written by Liz Phair